Jakob Lyng (1 April 1907, Søndbjerg – 27 May 1995) was a Danish fencer. He competed at the 1948 and 1952 Summer Olympics.

References

External links
 

1907 births
1995 deaths
People from Struer Municipality
Danish male fencers
Olympic fencers of Denmark
Fencers at the 1948 Summer Olympics
Fencers at the 1952 Summer Olympics
Sportspeople from the Central Denmark Region